James Su-ting Cheng (born July 20, 1960) is an American businessman who served as Secretary of Commerce and Trade under Virginia Governor Bob McDonnell. Cheng was born in Taipei, Taiwan and emigrated to the United States with his parents at the age of three. He attended Old Dominion University, the University of Virginia Darden School of Business, and Georgetown University Law Center.

References

External links
 Virginia Secretary of Commerce and Trade

Living people
State cabinet secretaries of Virginia
Old Dominion University alumni
University of Virginia Darden School of Business alumni
Georgetown University Law Center alumni
1960 births
American politicians of Taiwanese descent